Kafr Bara or Kfar Bara is an Israeli-Arab local council in Israel's Central District. The small town, located near the Green Line, is often considered a part of the Little Triangle along with Kafr Qasim and Jaljulia.

History
Pottery and glass dating from the  Roman period (second century CE) and  early Byzantine period (fourth century and beginning of fifth century CE), have been found in a   burial cave at Kafr Bara.  Various agricultural installations, including a winepress, dating from Byzantine era has also been excavated.
Archaeological  excavations have revealed remains, apparently from a rural settlement from the Byzantine and Early Islamic periods (sixth–ninth centuries CE).

Ottoman era
It had a population of 20 Muslim households, who  paid a fixed tax-rate of 33,3 % on agricultural products, including   wheat, barley, summer crops, and goats and/or beehives; a total of 2,920  akçe. 5/6 of the revenue went to a Waqf.

British Mandate era
At the 1931 census of Palestine, conducted by the  British Mandate Kafr Bara   had 95 inhabitants, all Muslims, in a total of  19 houses.

In  the 1945 statistics  the population of Kafr Bara was 150, all Muslims, who owned 3,959  dunams of land  according to an official land and population survey. Of this, 10 dunams were for citrus and bananas, 12 were plantations and irrigable land, 1,841 used for cereals, while 14 dunams were built-up (urban) land.

1948, and aftermath
After 1948, Kafr Bara has been part of Israel.

Demographics
Kafr Bara had a population of 3,274 in the 2014 census.

See also
 Arab localities in Israel

References

Bibliography

External links
 Welcome To Kafr Bara
Survey of Western Palestine, Map 14:    IAA, Wikimedia commons 

Arab localities in Israel
Triangle (Israel)
Local councils in Central District (Israel)